Greatest Hits is the first compilation album released by the punk rock band Half Japanese, in 1995. It includes the line ups from all albums released by the band.

History
Half Japanese's Greatest Hits, which was the band's first compilation album, was released on March 13, 1995, after more than twenty years of activity as a band. By the time it came out, the band had gained an international fan base and it had already released thirteen studio albums; since the release of the compilation, there have been three more. Half Japanese later released two more compilation albums.

Music
Greatest Hits is two discs and has at least one song from each album: from 1/2 Gentlemen/Not Beasts, with the band's original set, to Boo! Live in Europe 1992. The album features notable guests such as John Zorn and Eugene Chadbourne. 

There are strong differences in the styles as well as the sound fidelity between the songs. It is possible to find noise and electronic tracks, such as the ones from 1/2 Gentlemen/Not Beasts; punk rock songs, like those from Charmed Life; experimental songs, such as those from The Band That Would Be King as well as more straightforward rock from other releases.

Critical reception

Ned Raggett from Allmusic gave the album 4.5 stars of 5 calling it the best way to start with Half Japanese given the scattered discography of the band. He praised the songs "King Kong", "Amazing Clock" and "Identical Twins" as well as "How to Play Guitar", which, according to him, makes for a great final touch.

The album was included in Blender's top 100 indie rock albums, where it was called "undeniably difficult and triumphantly messy".

Track listing
All songs written by Jad Fair unless indicated.

Disc A

Disc B

Personnel
The people involved in the album are from the band's different line ups:
Terry Adams – piano  
Pippin Barnett – drums  
Hank Beckmeyer – bass guitar, guitar, producer  
George Cartwright – saxophone
Eugene Chadbourne – guitar, harmonica, vocals on "Blue Yodel No. 1 (T for Texas)" 
Byron Coley – liner notes  
David Doris – saxophone 
John Dreyfuss – saxophone  
Rick Dreyfuss – drums  
David Fair – guitar, percussion, vocals, liner notes  
Jad Fair – guitar, harmonica, vocals, producer  
Danny Finney – saxophone  
Don Fleming – guitar, vocals  
Tim Foljahn – guitar  
Fred Frith – guitar   
Mick Hobbs – guitar  
Scott Jarvis – drums  
Mark Jickling – guitar  
Steve Johnson – guitar  
Rob Kennedy – bass guitar
Kramer – organ, bass guitar, guitar, keyboards, producer  
Eppo Krol – producer  
Richard Labrie – drums  
David Licht – conga  
Joe Martinelli – drums  
Lisa Mednick – keyboards  
Gilles V. Rieder – drums, producer  
Rebby Sharp – guitar  
John Sluggett – guitar  
Jay Spiegel – drums  
Maureen Tucker – drums, producer  
Jason Willett – bass guitar
Gary Windo – saxophone  
Howard Wuelfing – bass guitar
Lana Zabko – saxophone  
Don Zientara – producer  
John Zorn – saxophone

References

1995 greatest hits albums
Punk rock compilation albums
Half Japanese albums